Susan Tagicakibau (born January 14, 1988) is a Fijian netball player. She was a member of the Fijian national netball team, Tagicakibau played in the ANZ Championship for the Central Pulse.

References
 Central Pulse team profiles

1988 births
Living people
Fijian netball players
Central Pulse players
Fijian expatriate sportspeople in New Zealand
ANZ Championship players